Alam Sutera is a mixed township at South Tangerang City and Tangerang City of Banten province in Indonesia. It is located south-west of capital Jakarta and within Jabodetabek metro area. The township has a land area of about 800 hectares. Most of the area are located in North Serpong, South Tangerang City, while some area, especially the CBD, are in Pinang sub-district, Tangerang City.

Facilities
 (Preschool, Daycare, Kindergarten, & Talent)
Mall @ Alam Sutera 
Flavor Bliss (culinary center)
Living World (shopping mall)
The Broadway (Tourist and culinary center)
Pasar 8 (shophouse cluster & traditional market)
Decathlon (sports superstore, sports facilities, restaurant and co-working area)
Depo Bangunan (construction materials supermarket)
Giant (department store)
OMNI Hospital
BINUS University
St.Laurensius Catholic Church
Santa Laurensia School 
IKEA Alam Sutera (the flagship IKEA store of Indonesia, opened in 2014)
Alam Sutera Sports Center
Mercure Serpong Hotel
CBD Alam Sutera

Transportation

Alam Sutera has direct access to Jakarta-Merak Toll Road. TransJakarta operates feeder routes to connect the township with Jakarta city center.
Township has an internal shuttle bus service, known as "SuteraLoop", which services Alam Sutera proper. It connects all areas in Alam Sutera including residential and commercial areas as well.

See also

Tangerang Regency
Jabodetabek
Banten

References 

Populated places in Banten
Planned townships in Indonesia
Post-independence architecture of Indonesia